Rhodanese, also known as rhodanase, thiosulfate sulfurtransferase, thiosulfate cyanide transsulfurase, and thiosulfate thiotransferase, is a mitochondrial enzyme that detoxifies cyanide (CN−) by converting it to thiocyanate (SCN−).

This reaction takes place in two steps. The diagram on the right shows the crystallographically-determined structure of rhodanese. In the first step, thiosulfate is reduced by the thiol group on cysteine-247 1, to form a persulfide and a sulfite 2. In the second step, the persulfide reacts with cyanide to produce thiocyanate, re-generating the cysteine thiol 1.

This reaction is important for the treatment of exposure to cyanide, since the thiocyanate formed is around 1 / 200 as toxic.:p. 15938 The use of thiosulfate solution as an antidote for cyanide poisoning is based on the activation of this enzymatic cycle.

Rhodanese shares evolutionary relationship with a large family of proteins, including

 Cdc25 phosphatase catalytic domain.
 non-catalytic domains of eukaryotic dual-specificity MAPK-phosphatases
 non-catalytic domains of yeast PTP-type MAPK-phosphatases
 non-catalytic domains of yeast Ubp4, Ubp5, Ubp7
 non-catalytic domains of mammalian Ubp-Y
 Drosophila heat shock protein HSP-67BB
 several bacterial cold-shock and phage shock proteins
 plant senescence associated proteins
 catalytic and non-catalytic domains of rhodanese

Rhodanese has an internal duplication. This domain is found as a single copy in other proteins, including phosphatases and ubiquitin C-terminal hydrolases.

Human proteins containing this domain 
CDC25A;    CDC25B;    CDC25C;    DUSP;      DUSP1;     DUSP10;    DUSP16;    
DUSP2;     DUSP4;     DUSP5;     DUSP6;     DUSP7;     KAT;       MKP7;      MOCS3;     
MPST;      TBCK;      TSGA14;    TST;       USP8;

Nomenclature
Although the standard nomenclature rules for enzymes indicate that their names are to end with the letters "-ase", rhodanese was first described in 1933, prior to the 1955 establishment of the Enzyme Commission; as such, the older name had already attained widespread usage.

Thiosulfate sulfurtransferase 

In enzymology, a thiosulfate sulfurtransferase is an enzyme that catalyzes the chemical reaction

thiosulfate + cyanide  sulfite + thiocyanate

Thus, the two substrates of this enzyme are thiosulfate and cyanide, whereas its two products are sulfite and thiocyanate.

Nomenclature 

This enzyme belongs to the family of transferases, specifically the sulfurtransferases, which transfer sulfur-containing groups.  The systematic name of this enzyme class is thiosulfate:cyanide sulfurtransferase. Other names in common use include thiosulfate cyanide transsulfurase, thiosulfate thiotransferase, rhodanese, and rhodanase.

References

External links

EC 2.8
Protein domains